Figueroa Street is a major north-south street in Los Angeles County, California, spanning from the Los Angeles neighborhood of Wilmington north to Eagle Rock. A short, unconnected continuation of Figueroa Street runs just south of Marengo Drive in Glendale to Chevy Chase Drive in La Cañada Flintridge.

The street is named for General José Figueroa (1792 – September 29, 1835), governor of Alta California from 1833 to 1835, who oversaw the secularization of the missions of California.

On "Mamba Day", August 24, 2020, then-Los Angeles City Council President Herb Wesson and council member Curren Price announced plans to rename the segment of Figueroa Street between Olympic Boulevard and Martin Luther King Jr. Boulevard as Kobe Bryant Boulevard, in honor of professional basketball player Kobe Bryant.

Route description

One of the longer streets in the city, it runs in a north/south direction for more than 30 miles (48 km) from its southern terminus at Harry Bridges Boulevard in the Wilmington neighborhood to Chevy Chase Drive in the city of La Cañada Flintridge at the north end.

From its south end at Harry Bridges Boulevard to Downtown Los Angeles, Figueroa Street runs north parallel to the Harbor Freeway (Interstate 110) in South Los Angeles. The only portion of this segment of Figueroa Street that lies outside Los Angeles city limits is in the city of Carson. South of the Los Angeles Financial District, Figueroa Street passes well-known locations including the University of Southern California, the Los Angeles Convention Center, and Crypto.com Arena/L.A. Live. 

Between Olympic Boulevard and 3rd Street in downtown Los Angeles, Figueroa Street forms a one-way pair with Flower Street, with northbound traffic staying on Figueroa and southbound traffic diverting to Flower.

After passing through downtown near Bunker Hill and South Park, the southern portion of Figueroa Street ends near the overcrossing of Sunset Boulevard over the Arroyo Seco Parkway (SR 110) in Chinatown. The northern portion of the street resumes at San Fernando Road in Cypress Park. An early routing of Figueroa Street in this area was originally part of U.S. Route 66, today a part of the Arroyo Seco Parkway (State Route 110). The noted Figueroa Street Tunnels were once a part of that same stretch of roadway.

After resuming at San Fernando Road, Figueroa continues to run roughly parallel to the Arroyo Seco Parkway until it reaches York Boulevard in Highland Park. Afterwards, it heads north to its terminus near the Scholl Canyon Landfill just past its junction with the Ventura Freeway (State Route 134) in Eagle Rock. A short, unconnected continuation of Figueroa Street runs from a residential area just south of Marengo Drive in Glendale to end at Chevy Chase Drive just over the city limit line in La Cañada Flintridge.

Early maps produced by the Automobile Club of Southern California measured distances to Los Angeles from the club's headquarters at the intersection of Figueroa Street with Adams Boulevard.

History

Figueroa was originally called Calle de los Chapules (or Grasshopper Street). Chapules (or chapul in the singular form) is not the standard Spanish word for grasshopper which is saltamonte. Chapul is from the Nahuatl of Durango and Nayarit (also known as Mexicanero) and means grasshopper. Later in the 1880s it became known as "Pearl Street". Figueroa Street originally was a few blocks west of Pearl but joined Pearl Street further south.  Pearl Street was changed to Figueroa and the northern portion of the old Figueroa Street was renamed Boylston. The section of what is now Figueroa in Highland Park above Avenue 39 was known as "Pasadena Avenue" until Figueroa was extended through Elysian Park. The portion of what is now Figueroa between the Los Angeles River and Avenue 39 was originally known as Dayton Avenue until the Arroyo Parkway went through.
Prior to construction of the Harbor Freeway, Figueroa St. carried U.S. Route 6 to Pacific Coast Highway south from the Four-Level Interchange.

Until 1977, the Guinness Book of Records claimed Figueroa as the longest street in the world, at the request of writer Jay Myers, it was supplanted by Yonge Street in Toronto.

On April 2, 2011, a portion of Figueroa Street at Jefferson Boulevard was blocked off for the "Orange Carpet" and the grandstand for the broadcasting of the 2011 Kids' Choice Awards.

In South Los Angeles, Figueroa Street has the highest number of prostitution-related arrests in Los Angeles.

The Los Angeles Lakers, the Los Angeles Kings and Los Angeles Rams have used Figueroa as the parade route for their respective championships in 2000, 2001, 2002, 2009 and 2010 for the Lakers, 2012 and 2014 for the Kings and in 2022 for the Rams.

Future

Kobe Bryant Boulevard
On August 24, 2020, then-Los Angeles City Council President Herb Wesson and council member Curren Price announced plans to rename the  segment of Figueroa Street between Olympic Boulevard and Martin Luther King Jr. Boulevard as Kobe Bryant Boulevard. It would be renamed in honor of professional basketball player Kobe Bryant, who along with his daughter Gianna and seven others were killed in a helicopter crash on January 26, 2020. The segment of Figueroa between Olympic and Martin Luther King Jr. Boulevard passes by the Crypto.com Arena, the home to the Los Angeles Lakers who Bryant played with throughout his entire 20-year career and is dubbed the "House that Kobe built". In October 21, 2020, the vote to consider the proposal was delayed by the council, and a new date has yet to be stated .

"My Figueroa" development plan and 2028 Summer Olympics
The Figueroa Corridor Streetscape project is a city led effort to beautify and improve the boulevard by adding pedestrian friendly amenities. The beautification project began on 7th street in Downtown Los Angeles, by Crypto.com Arena and terminates at Exposition Park at USC. The project began in 2017 and was completed by the end of 2018. It aimed to improve transit and pedestrian access, protected bike lanes totally protected by physical barriers, a more organized and efficient street by adding better signalization and signage, high-visibility crosswalks, transit platforms, more street trees, public art and wider sidewalks. The $20 million Figueroa Corridor Streetscape project was funded by a Proposition 1C grant. After delays, work was expected to commence in the summer of 2016 and was expected to be completed by March 2017, when the prop 1C grant expired. The Los Angeles 2028 organizing committee plan to use this corridor as a planned "Live Site", an area dedicated as a central pedestrian corridor, linking all of the Downtown LA venues together during the 2028 Olympic & Paralympic Games.

Major intersections

Transportation

The Metro C and J lines operate a station underneath Interstate 105 at Figueroa Street. Metro Local Line 81 operates on Figueroa Street between Colorado Boulevard and Interstate 105 and Torrance Transit Line 1 between Interstate 105 and the Harbor Gateway Transit Center. The Metro E Line has 5 stations nearby. Two of which are shared with the Metro A Line, one being a major hub connecting to the Metro B and D lines. The Metro J Line runs on Figueroa Street in Gardena and between 23rd and 6th Streets in Downtown: Northbound J line trips to El Monte Bus Station continue north on Figueroa Street to serve the 7th Street / Metro Center and finally turn right on 6th street, leaving Figueroa Street. Southbound J Line trips to Harbor Gateway Transit Center or San Pedro run south on Flower Street from 5th Street to the Harbor Transitway. There are 6 J Line street stops located on Figueroa Street: Figueroa/190th/Victoria; Northbound only: Figueroa/23rd, Figueroa/Washington, Figueroa/Pico, Figueroa/Olympic, and Figueroa/7th . In addition, there are 7 Metro J Line Stations served on the Harbor Transitway and Harbor Freeway close to Figueroa Street: 37th Street/USC, Slauson, Manchester, Harbor Freeway (with C Line connection), Rosecrans, Carson, and Pacific Coast Hwy. The Harbor Transitway is located on the I-110 freeway, between Figueroa Street and Broadway. There are also three Metro L Line stations near Figueroa Street: Lincoln/Cypress (at Avenue 26), Southwest Museum, and Highland Park (at Avenue 57).

Notable landmarks

 Automobile Club of Southern California
 BMO Stadium
 Bob Hope Patriotic Hall
 Bonaventure Hotel
 Crypto.com Arena
 Eagle Rock Historical Landmark
 Engine Co. 28 (1912 fire station)
 Exposition Park, including an historic palm tree moved there in 1914
 Hotel Figueroa (opened 1926, originally for women only)
 Flower Drive Historic District
 Galen Center
 The Grammy Museum
 Highland Park Adult Senior Citizen Center
 Jonathan Club
 L.A. Live
 Los Angeles Convention Center
 Los Angeles County Health Department
 Los Angeles Memorial Coliseum
 Original Pantry Cafe
 St. Vincent de Paul Church
 Stimson House
 State Bar of California
 University of Southern California
 Variety Arts Center Building
 Wilshire Grand Tower

Education
 Luther Burbank Middle School
 Florence Nightingale Middle School
 Optimist High School
 Sycamore Grove School
 University of Southern California

Buildings on Figueroa

Appearances in popular culture
The Figueroa corridor was featured by Huell Howser in Road Trip, episode 103.

References

External links

Streets in Los Angeles
Streets in Los Angeles County, California
Downtown Los Angeles
South Los Angeles
Carson, California
U.S. Route 6
U.S. Route 66 in California
Venues of the 2028 Summer Olympics